Martin Luther Jarrett (November 18, 1841 – September 23, 1920) was an American politician and physician from Maryland. He served as a member of the Maryland House of Delegates, representing Harford County, from 1908 to 1911.

Early life
Martin Luther Jarrett was born on November 18, 1841, in Jarrettsville, Maryland, to Julia Ann (née Scarff) and Luther M. Jarrett. His brother was James H. Jarrett. He studied medicine under Drs. Chew and Butler of Baltimore. He graduated from the University of Maryland in 1864.

Career
Jarrett served as a private in the 1st Maryland Cavalry in the Confederate States Army. He served until the end of the war.

Jarrett served as a member of the Maryland House of Delegates, representing Harford County, from 1908 to 1911.

Jarrett practiced medicine in Jarrettsville and retired from the practice around 1900.

Personal life
Jarrett married Fannie Glenn. They had no children. She died in 1898.

Jarrett died on September 23, 1920, at the home of his niece at 410 East 25th Street in Baltimore. He was buried at Calvary Church.

References

1841 births
1920 deaths
People from Jarrettsville, Maryland
University System of Maryland alumni
Democratic Party members of the Maryland House of Delegates
Confederate States Army soldiers
People of Maryland in the American Civil War
Physicians from Maryland